Honakuppi is a village in Belagavi district in the southern state of Karnataka, India. Dominated by [[Hegade & Gangaraddi & mathad families

References

Villages in Belagavi district